It's Not a Game is the second album released by Layzie Bone in 2005. The album peaked at number 15 on the Billboard Top Rap Albums chart, number 31 on the Top R&B/Hip-Hop Albums chart, and number 96 on the Billboard 200.

Tracks two and nine had previously appeared on his 2001 release Thug by Nature.

Track listing

References 

Layzie Bone albums
2005 mixtape albums
Gangsta rap albums by American artists